Dzmitry Platnitski (born 26 August 1988 in Brest) is a Belarusian triple jumper. He competed in the triple jump event at the 2008, 2012 and 2016 Summer Olympics.

Competition record

References

Sportspeople from Brest, Belarus
Belarusian male triple jumpers
1988 births
Living people
Olympic athletes of Belarus
Athletes (track and field) at the 2008 Summer Olympics
Athletes (track and field) at the 2012 Summer Olympics
Athletes (track and field) at the 2016 Summer Olympics
Olympic male triple jumpers